Paul Sonkkila (b. Australia  – d. April 2016, Australia) was an actor of stage and screen who trained in Australia and in London. He had a long career in theatre, but is remembered for his cinematic roles in The Interview (1998), The Year of Living Dangerously (1982), Sons And Daughters (1982), The Illustrated Family Doctor (2005) and Daybreakers (2009). He was a regular presence for over 20 years in Australian drama.

Filmography 
 Gallipoli (film)
 Phoenix (TV)
 The Year of Living Dangerously (film)
 The Interview (film)
 Stir (film) (1980) as McIntosh
 Halifax f.p. - episode 4 (1995) "My Lovely Girl"
 Rake (2014) - series 3 episode 5 as Father Bobby

References

External links 
 

Australian male actors
British expatriates in Australia
Year of birth missing
2016 deaths